The Grizzly Bear is an early 20th-century dance style. It started in San Francisco, along with the Bunny Hug and Texas Tommy and was also done on the Staten Island ferry boats in the 1900s. It has been said that dancers John Jarrott and Louise Gruenning introduced this dance as well as the Turkey Trot at Ray Jones Café in Chicago, Illinois around 1909. The Grizzly Bear was first introduced to Broadway audiences in the Ziegfeld Follies of 1910 by Fanny Brice.

The dance was rough and clumsy. During the dance, the dancers would yell out: "It's a Bear!" The genuine Grizzly Bear step was a correct imitation of the movements of a dancing bear, moving or dancing to the side. A very heavy step to the side with a decided bending of the upper part of the body from one side to the other, a decidedly ungraceful and undignified movement when performed as a dance.

It was reported that one of the reasons former President Woodrow Wilson's inaugural ball was cancelled was because of his "disapproval of such modern dances as the turkey trot, the grizzly bear and the bunny hug". Not long before this, in 1912, New York placed the dance under a "social ban", along with other "huggly-wiggly dances", like the Turkey Trot and the Boston Dip. It was also condemned in numerous cities across the US during the same time period, with many considering it to be a "degenerate dance".

However, a large portion of society accepted the dance, along with other similar dances. The Grizzly Bear dance was featured "on Broadway, in vaudeville, and at cabaret performances". In fact, it is believed that the first introduction to the "general public" of the dance came about in the original "Broadway production of Over the River" in 1912.

In popular culture
The Dance of the Grizzly Bear, published in 1910, was a song composed by George Botsford with lyrics by Irving Berlin which colloquially describes the origins of the dance along with its movements.
In Irving Berlin's 1911 song Everybody's Doin' It, the grizzly bear is quoted as a very popular dance, with even its characteristic cry "It's a bear!".
In the 1912 song hit That Shakespearian Rag by Dave Stamper and Gene Buck, the dance is referenced in the refrain.
In episode 2, season 1, of the British television period drama Downton Abbey, the footman Thomas Barrow teaches the kitchen maid Daisy how to dance the grizzly bear.
In episode 2, in miniseries Indian Summers on PBS, the Grizzle Bear Dance is performed by some of the British expatriate population during an evening soiree.
Folk-rock group The Youngbloods released their song "Grizzly Bear" in 1966, which mentions a woman dancing the Grizzly Bear, possibly in San Francisco.
 Folk singer Bill Morrissey's song, "Grizzly Bear", employs the phrase "... to dance the Grizzly Bear."

References

Social dance
Dance terminology